Manfred Jerome Palmes (5 February 1887 – 5 May 1968) was an English first-class cricketer and Royal Navy officer.

A member of the Palmes family, he was the son of Francis Jerome Palmes and Mary Theresa Broadbent and was born in February 1887 at Naburn Hall at Naburn, Yorkshire. Palmes graduated from the Britannia Royal Naval College in 1906, entering the Royal Navy as an acting sub-lieutenant, with confirmation in the rank coming in April 1908. The following April he was promoted to the rank of lieutenant. He served with the Royal Navy in the First World War, during which he was promoted to the rank of lieutenant commander in March 1917. Following the war, Palmes played first-class cricket for the Royal Navy Cricket Club, making two appearances against the British Army cricket team at Lord's in 1919 and 1920. He was promoted to the rank of commander in December 1921, a rank he retained until his retirement in February 1933. Palmes later emigrated to South Africa, where he died at Simon's Town in May 1968.

References

External links

1887 births
1968 deaths
Cricketers from York
Graduates of Britannia Royal Naval College
Royal Navy officers
Royal Navy personnel of World War I
English cricketers
Royal Navy cricketers
English emigrants to South Africa